Edward James Austin (25 September 1847 – 13 April 1891) was an English cricketer.  Austin was a right-handed batsman who bowled roundarm medium pace, though which arm he bowled with is unknown.  He was born at Buckland Ripers, Dorset.

While studying at Trinity College, Oxford, Austin made a single first-class appearance for Oxford University against the Marylebone Cricket Club at the Magdalen Ground, Oxford in 1869.  Austin ended unbeaten on 0 in Oxford University's first-innings of 75 all out, while in the Marylebone Cricket Club's first-innings of 229 all out, Austin took the wickets of Herbert Stewart and John West, finishing with figures of 2/58 from 24 overs.  In Oxford University's second-innings, Austin was dismissed for 10 runs by George Wootton, with the university being dismissed for 124 to lose the match by an innings and 30 runs.  This was his only major appearance for Oxford University.

He died at Pimlico, London on 13 April 1891.

References

External links
Edward Austin at ESPNcricinfo
Edward Austin at CricketArchive

1847 births
1891 deaths
Sportspeople from Weymouth
Cricketers from Dorset
Alumni of Trinity College, Oxford
English cricketers
Oxford University cricketers